Boy Meets Girl is a 2004 chick lit novel by American author Meg Cabot. It was first published in January, 2004 by HarperCollins, with the author name of "Meggin Cabot"; subsequent printings say "Meg Cabot". It is the second book in the Boy series, but its story is only loosely connected to that of its predecessor, The Boy Next Door.

Synopsis
The book follows Kate Mackenzie, who works in the Human Resources division of the New York Journal. She spends much of her days trying to find a good apartment, attempting to avoid her dictator-esque boss Amy, and trying to sort out her complicated relationship with a commitment-phobic boyfriend. Kate begins to despair once Amy forces her to fire an incredibly popular co-worker in one of the office's lunch rooms, which results in the employee suing her for wrongful termination. Things get even worse when she is also obligated to give a deposition to the handsome and wealthy Mitch Hertzog. The two are at odds over several things, but Kate finds herself growing wildly attracted to him.

Reception
Critical reception for Boy Meets Girl was mostly positive. Publishers Weekly commented that the book was "less a novel than a collection of lighthearted barbs, gleeful clichés and panicky (but comic and brief) freakouts" but ultimately stated it was a "fluffy, fun urban fairy tale". The book also garnered a positive reviews from the Arizona Republic and Booklist.

References

External links

2004 American novels
Novels by Meg Cabot
Chick lit novels